Massachusetts House of Representatives' 2nd Suffolk district in the United States is one of 160 legislative districts included in the lower house of the Massachusetts General Court. It covers part of the city of Boston and part of the city of Chelsea in Suffolk County. Democrat Dan Ryan of Charlestown has represented the district since 2015. Candidates for this district seat in the 2020 Massachusetts general election include the incumbent Ryan and Damali Vidot.

The current district geographic boundary overlaps with that of the Massachusetts Senate's Middlesex and Suffolk district.

Representatives
 Amos A. Dunnels, circa 1858-1859 
 Bradbury G. Prescott, circa 1858 
 Cyrus Washburn, circa 1858 
 Edward F. Porter, circa 1859 
 Stephen N. Stockwell, circa 1859 
 Patrick J. Kennedy, circa 1888 
 Thomas O. McEnany, circa 1888 
 John B. Cashman, circa 1920 
 Patrick F. Moran, circa 1920 
 Jeremiah Francis Brennan, circa 1951 
 Dennis Kearney, circa 1975 
 Richard A. Voke
 Eugene O'Flaherty
 Daniel Joseph Ryan, 2015-current

See also
 List of Massachusetts House of Representatives elections
 Other Suffolk County districts of the Massachusetts House of Representatives: 1st, 3rd, 4th, 5th, 6th, 7th, 8th, 9th, 10th, 11th, 12th, 13th, 14th, 15th, 16th, 17th, 18th, 19th
 List of Massachusetts General Courts
 List of former districts of the Massachusetts House of Representatives

Images
Portraits of legislators

References

Further reading

External links
 Ballotpedia
  (State House district information based on U.S. Census Bureau's American Community Survey).
 League of Women Voters of Boston

House
Government of Suffolk County, Massachusetts